The Battle of Darbytown Road was fought on October 13, 1864, between Union and Confederate forces.  The Confederates were attempting to retake ground they had lost to Federal forces during battles near Richmond, Virginia. Their efforts failed.
On October 13, Union forces advanced to find and feel the new Confederate defensive line in front of Richmond.  While mostly a battle of skirmishers, a Federal brigade assaulted fortifications north of Darbytown Road and was repulsed with heavy casualties. The Federals retired to their entrenched lines along New Market Road.

Background

Opposing forces

Union

Confederate

Battle

References

National Park Service battle description
CWSAC Report Update and Resurvey:Individual Battlefield Profiles
 Newsome, Hampton. Richmond Must Fall: The Richmond–Petersburg Campaign, October 1864. Kent, OH: Kent State University Press, 2013. .

Notes 

Petersburg Campaign
Battles of the Eastern Theater of the American Civil War
Confederate victories of the American Civil War
Henrico County in the American Civil War
1864 in Virginia
Battles of the American Civil War in Virginia
October 1864 events